The Dude Cowboy is a 1926 American silent Western film directed by Jack Nelson and written by Paul M. Bryan. The film stars Bob Custer, Flora Bramley, Billy Bletcher, Howard Truesdale, Bruce Gordon and Amber Norman. The film was released on October 31, 1926, by Film Booking Offices of America.

Cast  
 Bob Custer as Bob Ralston
 Flora Bramley as Doris Wrigmint
 Billy Bletcher as Shorty O'Day
 Howard Truesdale as Amos Wrigmint
 Bruce Gordon as Carl Kroth
 Amber Norman as Mable La Rue
 Sabel Johnson as Aver Du Pais
 Edward Gordon as Count Duse

References

External links
 

1926 films
1926 Western (genre) films
Film Booking Offices of America films
Films directed by Jack Nelson
American black-and-white films
Silent American Western (genre) films
1920s English-language films
1920s American films